From April 1948, the member states of the Western Union (WU), decided to create a military agency under the name of the Western Union Defence Organisation (WUDO). WUDO was formally established on September 27–28, 1948.

Objective
The objective of WUDO was to provide for the coordination of defence between the five powers in the military and supply fields and for the study of the tactical problems of the defence of Western Europe; in addition, to provide a framework on which, in the event of any emergency, a command organization could be built up.

The Treaty of Brussels contained a mutual defence clause as set forth in Article IV:

If any of the High Contracting Parties should be the object of an armed attack in Europe, the other High Contracting Parties will, in accordance with the provisions of Article 51 of the Charter of the United Nations, afford the Party so attacked all the military and other aid and assistance in their power.

Article V set forth the obligations of Brussels Pact members to cooperate with the United Nations Security Council to maintain international peace and security, and Article VI set forth the obligations of Brussels Pact members to not enter any third-party treaties that conflicted with the Treaty of Brussels.

The overall command structure was patterned after the wartime Supreme Headquarters Allied Expeditionary Force, which included a joint planning staff.

Structure

:

Defence Committee
Direction and control was provided by the Western Union Defence Committee which, in peacetime, was composed of the national defence ministers. The Defence Committee was served by the Chiefs-of-Staff Committee and the Military Supply Board, meeting regularly in London. These bodies were analogous to the U.K.'s Chiefs of Staff Committee and Joint War Production Staff, respectively.

Secretariat
The secretariat worked for the other bodies, and had a British Secretary General.

Military Supply Board
In parallel with this Chiefs-of-Staff organisation, the Western Union Military Supply Board advised the Defence Committee on all questions affecting military supplies and made recommendations as to how the requirements of the Five Powers for Military Supplies could be met. The Supply Board was on a high level and was composed of one representative from each country. The British representative, who was to be chairman for the first year, was also Chairman of the British Joint War Production Staff. The infrequent meetings of the Board were served by a permanent Executive Committee working in London, composed of representatives from each country.

Chiefs-of-Staff Committee
The Western Union Chiefs of Staff Committee (WUCOS), based in London, United Kingdom, consisted of the five national chiefs of staff.

WUCOS directed the operative organisation and advised the Defence Committee on all matters affecting the defence of Western Europe, taking account of commitments in other parts of the world. Within this broad direction, its special tasks in Western Europe were those such as:
 ensuring that the military resources of the five countries were organized to meet the strategic requirements of the Allies
 ensuring the forces of the various nations were welded into an effective fighting machine
 ensuring their combined resources were allotted in the best way
 maintaining a proper balance between the conflicting requirements of internal security and home defence on the one hand, and the European battle on the other
 evaluation, preparation and distribution of the necessary resources, in particular to the Commander of the European battle, whose special task was to make the necessary operational plans and put them into operation
 keeping constantly under review definition of the exact area of the responsibility of the command of the European battle in war

WUCOS included observers from the United States and Canada. This American liaison mission was initially led by Major General Lyman L. Lemnitzer, U.S. Army, and subsequently by Major General A. Franklin Kibler, U.S. Army.

Commanders-in-Chief Committee

The Western Union Commanders-in-Chief Committee, responsible to the Western Union Chiefs-of-Staff Committee, was created on 5 October 1948.

The committee consisted of Western Union Commanders-in-Chief for the three military branches (Land, Naval and Air), as well as the senior officer, designated Chairman. Their immediate task was to study the tactical problems of the defence of Western Europe, i.e. make plans to meet a Soviet armed threat in Western Europe. They did not assume executive command of any forces in peacetime, although they were in close contact with Military Governors of the occupation zones, and it was hoped that, to a limited extent, peacetime dispositions could be adjusted to meet the needs of defence.

Château de Courances served as private residence for Chairman Montgomery.

Combined Allied Command

The committee formed a nucleus command organisation in the French town of Fontainebleau, south of Paris, known as the Combined Allied Command of WUDO (UNILION), which, in war, would be capable of commanding all land forces and supporting air forces to meet a Soviet armed threat. UNILION employed c. 100 officers and 300 other personnel.

The top-level headquarters of UNILION, with the office of the C-in-C Committee Chairman, was housed in Château des Fougères in Fontainebleau's neighbouring commune of Avon.

UNILION's three subordinate commands, one for each service, were housed in the Henri IV quarter at the Palace of Fontainebleau:
 Sea Command (UNIMER)
 Air Command (UNIAIR)
 Land Command (UNITER)

Much ill-feeling was caused in the headquarters from disagreements between Chairman Montgomery and CinCLand de Lattre. Volume 3 of Nigel Hamilton's Life of Montgomery of Alamein gives a good account of these disagreements.

Military exercises 

The Western Union mounted the following training exercises (incomplete list):

Notes

References

International military organizations